The Caxton Private Lending Library & Book Depository is a short story (book) written by John Connolly and published by Mysterious Press in January 2013, which later went on to win the Edgar Award and Anthony Award for best short story in 2014.

References 

2013 short stories
Edgar Award-winning works
Anthony Award-winning works
Irish short stories
Mysterious Press books